Radom is a city in Masovian Voivodeship, Poland.

Radom may also refer to:

Radom County
Radom Voivodeship, an administrative division of Poland in 1975–1998
Radom Department, an administrative division of the Duchy of Warsaw (1806–1815)
Radom, Greater Poland Voivodeship, a village in west-central Poland
Radom, Illinois
Radom National Park in Sudan
 Radom, a name in English-speaking countries for a number of guns produced by the Łucznik Arms Factory
RADOM-7, a Bulgarian space radiation measurement instrument
Radom is the name of Zofis' first spell in the anime and manga series Zatch Bell! 

See also:
Radome, an enclosure that protects a radar antenna